Colegio Bernardo Valdivieso, located in Loja, Ecuador, is the oldest school in the country.

This school was founded on October 22, 1806 in Loja, Ecuador by the Dr. Bernardo Valdivieso

References

Education in Ecuador